The Azerbaijan Men's Volleyball League, is the highest professional men's volleyball league in Azerbaijan. It is run by the Azerbaijan Volleyball Federation. It is considered one of the top national leagues in European volleyball, as its clubs have made significant success in European competitions.

2016-17 season

Champions
 2001-2002 Azerneft
 2002-2003 Azerneft
 2003-2004 Azerneft
 2004-2005 Azerneft
 2005-2006 Azerneft
 2006-2007 Azerneft
 2007-2008 Azerneft
 2008-2009 Neftçi Baku
 2009-2010 Neftçi Baku
 2010-2011 Neftçi Baku
 2011-2012 Neftçi Baku
 2012-2013 Neftçi Baku
 2013-2014 Neftçi Baku
 2014-2015 Neftçi Baku
 2015-2016 Neftçi Baku
 2017-2018 Lokomotiv Baku
 2018-2019 Lokomotiv Baku
 2019-2020 Xilasedici

See also
 Azerbaijan Women's Volleyball Super League
 Azerbaijan Volleyball Federation

References

External links
Azerbaijan Volleyball Federation official web page

Azerbaijan
Mens
Sports leagues established in 1992